Onuphis is a genus of polychaete belonging to the family Onuphidae.

The genus has cosmopolitan distribution.

Species:

Onuphis affinis 
Onuphis amakusaensis 
Onuphis anadonae 
Onuphis atlantisa
Onuphis aucklandensis 
Onuphis augeneri 
Onuphis branchiata 
Onuphis brevicirris 
Onuphis chinensis 
Onuphis declivorum 
Onuphis dibranchiata 
Onuphis elegans 
Onuphis eremita 
Onuphis erici 
Onuphis farallonensis 
Onuphis farensis 
Onuphis fuscata 
Onuphis geophiliformis 
Onuphis hanneloreae 
Onuphis hokkaiensis 
Onuphis holobranchiata 
Onuphis imajimai 
Onuphis iridescens 
Onuphis iriei 
Onuphis kammurijimaensis 
Onuphis landanaensis 
Onuphis longisetosa 
Onuphis mexicana 
Onuphis multiannulata 
Onuphis nakaoi 
Onuphis nonpectinata 
Onuphis opalina 
Onuphis pallida 
Onuphis pancerii 
Onuphis pseudoiridescens 
Onuphis punggolensis 
Onuphis rullieriana 
Onuphis setosa 
Onuphis shijikiensis 
Onuphis shirikishinaiensis 
Onuphis similis 
Onuphis taraba 
Onuphis tetradentata 
Onuphis texana 
Onuphis tosaensis 
Onuphis uschakovi 
Onuphis variolata 
Onuphis vibex

References

Annelids